is a Japanese chemical company, producing cyanoacrylate adhesives since 1963. Other chemical products of the company include high purity gases, soda and chlorine products, and instant glue, which is sold in Japan as Aron Alpha and marketed in the United States as Krazy Glue.

The company was originally named Yahagi Kogyo and was founded by Momosuke Fukuzawa in 1933 with the manufacturing of ammonium sulfate, sulfuric acid, and nitric acid as its products. The present company was formed when Yahagi Kogyo merged with three other chemical companies in 1944.

References

External links
 Official global website 

Mitsui
Chemical companies based in Tokyo
Manufacturing companies based in Tokyo
Companies listed on the Tokyo Stock Exchange
Chemical companies established in 1933
1933 establishments in Japan
Japanese brands